Storm Sanders and Kateřina Siniaková defeated Alizé Cornet and Jil Teichmann in the final, 6–4, 6–3 to win doubles tennis title at the 2022 WTA German Open.

Victoria Azarenka and Aryna Sabalenka were the defending champions, but Azarenka did not return to compete. Sabalenka partnered with Veronika Kudermetova but they withdrew before their first round match.

Seeds

Draw

Draw

References

External links 
Main draw

2022 WTA Tour
2022 WTA German Open - 2